The 1977–78 Sheffield Shield season was the 76th season of the Sheffield Shield, the domestic first-class cricket competition of Australia. Western Australia won the championship. Tasmania competed for the first time.

Table

Statistics

Most Runs
David Ogilvie 1060

Most Wickets
David Hourn 48

References

Sheffield Shield
Sheffield Shield
Sheffield Shield seasons